Lacey Earnest Hearn (March 23, 1881 – October 19, 1969 in Fort Wayne, Indiana) was an American athlete and middle distance runner who competed in the early twentieth century. Individually he specialized in the 1500 Metres, and he won a bronze medal in Athletics at the 1904 Summer Olympics. James Lightbody took gold. Hearn was also a member of the American distance team which won the silver medal at the 1904 Olympics, competing in the Chicago American team in the 4 mile team race, consisting of James Lightbody, Frank Verner, Hearn, Albert Corey and Sidney Hatch.

References

External links 
 
 

1881 births
1969 deaths
Athletes (track and field) at the 1904 Summer Olympics
Olympic bronze medalists for the United States in track and field
Olympic silver medalists for the United States in track and field
Place of birth missing
Medalists at the 1904 Summer Olympics